Bedwell Harbour Water Aerodrome  is located on Bedwell Harbour, British Columbia, Canada, in the southern part of Pender Island in the Gulf Islands.

The airport is classified as an airport of entry by Nav Canada and is staffed by the Canada Border Services Agency (CBSA) on a call-out basis from the Victoria International Airport. CBSA officers at this airport can handle general aviation aircraft only, with no more than 15 passengers.

Airlines and destinations

See also
 List of airports in the Gulf Islands

References

Seaplane bases in British Columbia
Transport in the Capital Regional District
Airports in the Gulf Islands
Registered aerodromes in British Columbia